Semerninskoye is a rural locality (a village) in Zadneselskoye Rural Settlement, Ust-Kubinsky District, Vologda Oblast, Russia. The population was 3 as of 2002.

Geography 
Semerninskoye is located 22 km north of Ustye (the district's administrative centre) by road. Pakutino is the nearest rural locality.

References 

Rural localities in Tarnogsky District